Al Ghazwah FC  is a Saudi Arabian football team in Badr City playing at the Saudi Fourth Division.

References

External links
 Al Ghazwah FC at Kooora.com

Ghazwah
1979 establishments in Saudi Arabia
Association football clubs established in 1979
Football clubs in Badr, Saudi Arabia